Bresler's 33 Flavors was an American ice cream chain founded in 1927. Its founder was Polish immigrant William J. Bresler, who died in 1985.

In 1954, Bresler's began a fast food hamburger chain called Henry's Hamburgers.

The Bresler's chain was sold in 1987 to Oberweis Dairy in Aurora, Illinois. At the time, it comprised 300 stores, of which 297 were franchises.

Shortly afterward, the chain was renamed from Bresler's 33 Flavors to Bresler's Ice Cream, and added frozen yogurt to its menus to compete with TCBY. Two years later, Oberweis sold the chain to David Lasky.

Yogen Früz parent company CoolBrands acquired the chain in 1995 and began expanding it internationally, including locations in Israel and Egypt. CoolBrands rebranded the last five Bresler's locations in 2007.

References

American companies established in 1927
Restaurants established in 1927
Restaurants disestablished in 2007
1927 establishments in Illinois
1987 mergers and acquisitions
1995 mergers and acquisitions
Fast-food franchises
Ice cream brands
Ice cream parlors
Defunct ice cream parlors
Restaurants in Illinois
Defunct restaurant chains in the United States
Defunct companies based in Chicago
CoolBrands International